A-1, known internationally as A-1 Headline, is a 2004 Hong Kong thriller film written and directed by Gordon Chan and Rico Chung and starring Anthony Wong, Angelica Lee, Edison Chen, with a special appearance by Tony Leung Ka-fai.

Cast
 Anthony Wong as Lam Hei-fei
 Angelica Lee as Elaine Tse
 Edison Chen as Kevin
 Tony Leung Ka-fai as Chief Editor Terrence Tsang Tat-si (special starring)
 Eric Kot as Ma Chai
 Gordon Lam as Tong
 Joel Chan as Sean Cheung
 Dante Lam as Ken

References

External links
 

2004 films
2004 thriller films
Hong Kong thriller films
2000s Cantonese-language films
2000s English-language films
Films directed by Gordon Chan
Films about journalists
Films set in Hong Kong
Films shot in Hong Kong
2004 multilingual films
Hong Kong multilingual films
2000s Hong Kong films